Harry E. Chapman (October 26, 1885 – October 21, 1918) was a professional baseball player. He played all or part of five seasons in Major League Baseball for the Chicago Cubs, Cincinnati Reds, St. Louis Terriers, and St. Louis Browns, primarily as a catcher. He saw the majority of his action as a backup backstop for the Terriers in the Federal League.

Early career 

Chapman played minor league baseball in the Central Kansas League. He made his major league debut on October 6, 1912, the final game of the Chicago Cubs' season, and went 1-for-4 with a triple and an RBI. On December 15 that offseason, Chapman was traded by the Cubs, along with Grover Lowdermilk and future Hall of Famer Joe Tinker, to the Cincinnati Reds for five players. Chapman, however, played with the minor-league Atlanta Crackers for much of 1913. He made two pinch-hitting appearances for the Reds that season, singling and striking out.

Federal League 
The catcher was one of many MLB players to jump to the upstart Federal League in 1914, signing with the St. Louis Terriers. He played with them for both seasons of their existence, backing up Mike Simon and Grover Hartley. In 1914, Chapman hit .210 in 64 games with two doubles, a triple, and 14 RBI. In 1915, Chapman had the experience of playing for the league champions and had a somewhat more successful season himself, hitting .199 in 62 games with six doubles, three triples, one home run, and 29 RBI. His home run, the only such hit of his career, came off Baltimore's George Suggs.

Later career 
Just before the dissolution of the Federal League, the St. Louis Browns purchased Chapman's rights from the Terriers. However, his time with the Browns resulted in numbers well below his career averages, as Chapman hit just .097 (3 for 31) in 18 games with no extra-base hits or RBI. He played his final major league game in July 1916, and spent the last two seasons of his career toiling for the Little Rock Travelers of the Southern Association, playing a career-high 131 games in 1917.

Chapman died at age 30 in Nevada, Missouri, October 21, 1918, from influenza-induced pneumonia, a victim of the Spanish flu.

Chapman was one of eight Major League Baseball players known either to have been killed or died from illness while serving in the armed forces during World War I.  The others were Alex Burr‚ Larry Chappell‚ Harry Glenn, Eddie Grant‚ Newt Halliday, Ralph Sharman and Bun Troy.

See also
 List of baseball players who died during their careers

References

External links

Major League Baseball catchers
Chicago Cubs players
St. Louis Browns players
St. Louis Terriers players
Cincinnati Reds players
Concordia Travelers players
Topeka Jayhawks players
Sioux City Packers players
Atlanta Crackers players
Little Rock Travelers players
Baseball players from Kansas
People from Doniphan County, Kansas
American military personnel killed in World War I
1885 births
1918 deaths
Deaths from the Spanish flu pandemic in the United States
Deaths from pneumonia in Missouri
Military personnel from Kansas
Deaths from the Spanish flu pandemic in Missouri